Theodor Anton Neagu (September 20, 1932 – March 5, 2017) was a Romanian micropaleontologist, stratigrapher, and, since 2001, titular member of the Romanian Academy. Neagu specialized in Upper Cretaceous foraminifera found in strata of the Carpathian Mountains.

References

1932 births
2017 deaths
People from Giurgiu
Titular members of the Romanian Academy
Micropaleontologists
Academic staff of the University of Bucharest